Lucy Wigmore is a stage and screen actress  from New Zealand. She played core cast member Dr Justine Jones in the long-running soap opera Shortland Street, and has also starred as Lillian May Armfield in Underbelly: Razor, a 13-part drama set in the 1920s–1930s on the rough and ready streets of Sydney, Australia. Underbelly "is one of Nine Networks most successful franchises".
In 2015 Wigmore made a short film called Stationery which she wrote and directed.

Personal life
Wigmore was raised in Auckland, New Zealand, where she attended Takapuna Grammar School. She studied international business and advertising at the Auckland University of Technology, and spent her final year of study in France.

Wigmore also completed a three-year Bachelor of Performing Arts (Acting) at Toi Whakaari New Zealand's National Drama School, graduating in 2002. She had her first AD and casting role in the Embrace Life Commercial for Sussex Safer Roads.

Wigmore's sister Gin is a singer and songwriter. Lucy directed one of Gin's music videos, 2016's "Willing to Die". One of Gin's songs, "Lucy Loo," was written for her sister.

Filmography

References

External links 

 
 http://www.lucywigmore.com/

Living people
New Zealand television actresses
Australian television actresses
People from Auckland
Auckland University of Technology alumni
Australian stage actresses
1977 births
New Zealand soap opera actresses
21st-century New Zealand actresses
Toi Whakaari alumni